The following is a timeline of the history of the city of Grenoble, France.

Prior to 11th century

 43 BCE – First mention of Cularo
 4th century – Roman Catholic diocese of Cularo established.
 292 – Gallo-Roman wall of Cularo completed
 381 – Cularo becomes Gratianopolis
 879 – Grenoble becomes part of the Kingdom of Provence.
 902 – First reference of Grenoble Cathedral

11th–17th centuries
 1012 – First mention of Saint-Laurent Church
 1110 – The son of Count Guigues III of Albon is nicknamed Dauphin (Guigo Delphinus), later Dauphin of France
 1219 – September: .
 1337 –  (court) founded.
 1339 – Gratianopolis becomes Gregnoble
 1381 – Construction start of the 
 1390 – Public clock installed (approximate date).
 1453 -  created.
 1539 -  expanded.
 1562 - Sacked by the Protestants under Baron des Adrets
 1590 - Duke of Lesdiguières took the town in the name of Henry IV.
 1592 - First Bastille built by Lesdiguières.
 1625 –  built.
 1627 – General Hospital construction begins.
 1639 – Construction start of a new wall by François de Bonne de Crequi
 1647 – Construction start of Sainte-Marie-d'en-Bas
 1675 – End of the construction of the wall by Crequi
 1699 – Saint-Louis Church erected

18th century
 1772 –  and Bibliothèque municipale de Grenoble founded.
 1778 – October: Flood ("déluge de Saint-Crépin").
 1788 – 7 June: Social unrest ("Day of the Tiles").
 1790 – Grenoble becomes part of the Isère souveraineté.
 1793 – Population: 20,019.
 1798 – Museum of Grenoble established.

19th century
 1810 – Saint Roch Cemetery opened
 1815 - Opened its gates to Napoleon on his return from Elba on 7 March.
 1836 – Extension of wall by general Haxo
 1847 – Bastille rebuilt by general Haxo.
 1858 –  railway begins operating.
 1859 – 2 November: Grenoble flood.
 1864
 Grenoble–Montmélian railway begins operating.
 Chamber of Commerce established.
 1886 – Population: 52,484.
 1892 – FC Grenoble (football club) formed.
 1894 – Tram begins operating.(fr)
 1899
  established.
  begins operating.

20th century

 1906
 Opening of the Musée dauphinois
 Population: 58,641.
 1911 – Population: 77,438.
 1925
 International Exhibition of Hydropower and Tourism held in Grenoble.
 Perret tower (Grenoble) erected.
 1934 – Grenoble-Bastille cable car begins operating.
 1945 – Le Dauphiné libéré newspaper begins publication.
 1946 - Population: 102,161.
 1956 - First works in Polygone Scientifique
 1965 -  becomes mayor.
 1966 – opening of Musée de la Résistance et de la Déportation
 1967
 Palais des Sports (Grenoble) opens.
 Foundation of the Institut Laue–Langevin
 Foundation of LETI
 1968
 Gare de Grenoble rebuilt.
 1968 Winter Olympics held in Grenoble.
 1970 – Joseph Fourier University, Pierre Mendès-France University, and Stendhal University established.
 1973 - Socialist Party national congress held in Grenoble.
 1976 - Population : 
 1982 – Grenoble becomes part of the Rhône-Alpes region.
 1983 – Alain Carignon becomes mayor.
 1987 – Grenoble tramway begins operating.
 1994
 new building for the Museum of Grenoble
 European Synchrotron Radiation Facility begins operating.
 1995 – Michel Destot becomes mayor.
 1997 – Grenoble Foot 38 (football club) formed.
 1998
 Musée de l'Ancien Évêché inaugurated
 March: 1998 Rhône-Alpes regional election held.
 2000 – Socialist Party national congress held in Grenoble again.

21st century

 2001 – Opening of Patinoire Polesud
 2004 – March: 2004 Rhône-Alpes regional election held.
 2005 – Launch of téléGrenoble Isère (local television).
 2006 – Opening of Minatec.
 2008 – Stade des Alpes (stadium) opens.
 2011 – Population: 157,424.;> opening of Clinatec
 2014
 March:  held.
 Éric Piolle becomes mayor.
 2015
 Grenoble-Alpes Métropole established.
  people demonstrate against attacks in Paris
 December:  held.
 2016 – Grenoble becomes part of the Auvergne-Rhône-Alpes region.

See also
 Grenoble history
 
 List of mayors of Grenoble
 
  department
  region

other cities in the Auvergne-Rhône-Alpes region
 Timeline of Clermont-Ferrand
 Timeline of Lyon
 Timeline of St Etienne

References

This article incorporates information from the French Wikipedia.

Bibliography

in English
 *

in French
 
 
 
 
  v.1 (1848–55) + v.2 (1855–62)
  circa 1900s

External links

 Items related to Grenoble, various dates (via Europeana).
 Items related to Grenoble, various dates (via Digital Public Library of America).

Grenoble